The Looff Carousel in Pawtucket, Rhode Island is a historic carousel which was built in 1895 by Charles I. D. Looff. The carousel was originally located in a carnival called Lee Funland in upstate, New York.  The carousel was relocated to its present location at Slater Park in 1910 where it continues to operate.

Notable Features
The carousel features a functioning North Tonawanda Military band organ, as well as 44 standing horses, 6 menagerie animals (1 camel, 3 dogs, 1 giraffe, 1 lion), and 2 chariots.

History
In 1910 the City of Pawtucket leased a small lot just southeast of the Daggett House to John Walker of Providence, a noted carousel concessionaire. Walker quickly erected a ten-sided wooden canopy and had the Looff carousel moved from New York to Pawtucket.  The carousel began operation in Slater Park by July 1910. Locals referred to the site as "The Darby Horses".

On July 3, 2010, the carousel celebrated 100 years of operation in Slater Park.

Gallery

References

Carousels in Rhode Island
Buildings and structures in Pawtucket, Rhode Island
Tourist attractions in Pawtucket, Rhode Island
Amusement rides introduced in 1895